Richard Ross (born June 12, 1992) is an American professional basketball player.

Professional career

Joondalup Wolves (2017)
In his debut with the Wolves, Ross recorded 16 points and 3 rebounds in a 104–101 win over the Cockburn Cougars.

Rain or Shine Elasto Painters (2019)
With Rain or Shine Elasto Painter's current import, Kwame Alexander, out due to an injury. The Elasto Painters taps Ross to be their fourth import of the 2019 PBA Governors' Cup. In his PBA debut, Ross recorded 20 points, 8 rebounds and 4 assists in just 28 minutes of playing time on a 91–111 loss to the NLEX Road Warriors.

References

External links
 at Eurobasket.com
Old Dominion Monarchs bio

1992 births
Living people
American expatriate basketball people in Australia
American expatriate basketball people in China
American expatriate basketball people in Indonesia
American expatriate basketball people in Luxembourg
American expatriate basketball people in the Philippines
American expatriate basketball people in Norway
American expatriate basketball people in Venezuela
American men's basketball players
Basketball players from Texas
Halcones de Xalapa players
Marinos B.B.C. players
Old Dominion Monarchs men's basketball players
People from Wichita Falls, Texas
Philippine Basketball Association imports
Rain or Shine Elasto Painters players
Small forwards